The legislative districts of Santa Rosa are the representation of the component city of Santa Rosa, Laguna in the Congress of the Philippines. The city is represented in the lower house of the Congress through its lone congressional district since 2022.

History
Santa Rosa was represented as part of the at-large district of Laguna in the Malolos Congress (1898–1899), National Assembly of the Second Philippine Republic (1943–1944) and Regular Batasang Pambansa (1984–1986) and the first district of Laguna from 1907–1941, 1945–1972, and 1987–2022. The province of Laguna was represented in the Interim Batasang Pambansa as part of Region IV-A from 1978 to 1984.

On August 28, 2019, Santa Rosa was granted its own representation in the House of Representatives beginning in 2022 by virtue of Republic Act No. 11395. However, the city's residents still vote as part of the province's 1st Sangguniang Panlalawigan district for the purpose of electing Provincial Board members.

Lone District 
The city's current representative is a member of the National Unity Party who is part of the majority bloc in the 19th Congress.

Election result

2022

See also 
Legislative districts of Laguna

References 

Santa Rosa
Santa Rosa, Laguna
Santa Rosa